Joseph Conrad "Mule" Sprinz (August 3, 1902 – January 11, 1994) was a Major League Baseball player who attempted to beat the World Record for catching a baseball dropped from a great height.

Baseball career 
Joseph Sprinz was a major league catcher who played for the Cleveland Indians from 1930 to 1931 and the St. Louis Cardinals in 1933. He also played for the minor league team San Francisco Seals.

Attempt at World Record 
As a member of the San Francisco Seals, Sprinz attempted to beat the World Record for catching a baseball dropped from a great height, set by members of the 1938 Cleveland Indians. On his fifth attempt, a baseball entered his glove, slamming his glove hand into his face with such force that he broke his upper jaw in twelve places, fractured five of his teeth, and was rendered unconscious.

Controversy 
Some believe that the San Francisco Seals were involved in arranging for Joe Sprinz to make an attempt at the world record despite the known danger. Even though no evidence has been shown in response to the claim, it is well known that Minor League Baseball needs promotional stunts for survival and that it was a member of Sprinz's own team the San Francisco Seals that arranged for the ball to be dropped from the Goodyear Blimp.

References

External links

1902 births
1994 deaths
Major League Baseball catchers
Cleveland Indians players
St. Louis Cardinals players
Baseball players from Missouri
San Francisco Seals (baseball) players
Arkansas City Osages players